The Prehistory Museum of Tripoli is a museum located in Tripoli, Libya.

See also 

 List of museums in Libya

References 

Museums with year of establishment missing
History museums
Museums in Tripoli, Libya